Emilia Isobel Euphemia Rose Clarke (born 23 October 1986) is a British actress. She is best known for her portrayal of Daenerys Targaryen in Game of Thrones. She has received various accolades, including an Empire Award, a Saturn Award, three Critics' Choice Award nominations and four Primetime Emmy Award nominations. In 2019, Time named her one of the 100 most influential people in the world.

Clarke studied at Drama Centre London, appearing in a number of stage productions. Her television debut was a guest appearance in the BBC One medical soap opera Doctors in 2009. The following year, she was named as one of the "UK Stars of Tomorrow" by Screen International magazine for her role in the TV film Triassic Attack (2010). Clarke had her breakthrough role as Daenerys Targaryen, in the HBO epic fantasy television series Game of Thrones (2011–2019).

Clarke made her Broadway debut as Holly Golightly in the 2013 play Breakfast at Tiffany's, and played Nina in a West End production of The Seagull that was suspended due to the COVID-19 pandemic. Her film roles include Sarah Connor in the science fiction film Terminator Genisys (2015), Qi'ra in the Star Wars film Solo: A Star Wars Story (2018), and the romance films Me Before You (2016) and Last Christmas (2019).

Early life

Emilia Isobel Euphemia Rose Clarke was born on 23 October 1986 in London. She grew up in Oxfordshire. Her father, Peter Clarke, was a theatre sound engineer from Wolverhampton.  Her mother, Jennifer, was a businesswoman and is the vice-president for marketing at a global management consultancy firm . Clarke has Indian ancestry on her mother's side of the family; her maternal grandmother was the child of a secret affair between Clarke's great-grandmother and a man from the Indian subcontinent, and wore light make-up to conceal the darker complexion she had inherited from her father. She credits this background for her family's having a "history of fighters", stating, "The fact that [my grandmother] had to hide her skin colour, essentially, and try desperately to fit in with everyone else must've been incredibly difficult." She stated that her grandmother "loved India more than she loved England" and as such, when she died, sixteen-year-old Clarke travelled to India to scatter her ashes. She has an older brother, Bennett, who works in the entertainment industry and was part of the camera department on Game of Thrones.

Clarke became interested in acting at age three after seeing a production of the musical Show Boat. When she was ten, her father took her to a West End audition for The Goodbye Girl, a musical by Neil Simon. Clarke was educated at Rye St Antony School in Headington and St Edward's School, Oxford, which she left in 2005. In a 2016 interview with Time Out, she stated "I went to posh boarding schools, but I wasn't the posh girl at the posh boarding schools." She also stated that most of the people at her boarding school in Oxford were from Conservative backgrounds, which meant she and some of her friends often felt like outsiders. After graduation, Clarke unsuccessfully applied to the Royal Academy of Dramatic Art, the London Academy of Music and Dramatic Art, and the Guildhall School of Music and Drama. She worked and travelled before enrolling at Drama Centre London, where she graduated in 2009.

Career

2000–2010: Beginnings
Clarke started to act in stage productions while attending school. She appeared in student productions of Twelfth Night and West Side Story while attending St Edward's School. After taking a sabbatical year, she was accepted into Drama Centre London. Clarke also appeared the 2009 production of Sense, co-produced by theatre company Company of Angels and Drama Centre London.

One of her first film roles was in Drop the Dog, a University of London student short film. She graduated from drama school in 2009. She worked at various non-acting jobs after graduating while auditioning for roles. She starred in two commercials for the charity Samaritans, portraying a domestic abuse victim. Her first credited television role was a bit part in a 2009 episode of the British soap opera Doctors. Clarke was cast in her first professional film role, playing Savannah in the 2010 television film Triassic Attack. The film was released in November 2010 on the Syfy channel in the United States where it received negative reviews. Despite the film's reviews, she was named a "UK Star of Tomorrow" by the film magazine Screen International.

2011–2019: Game of Thrones and worldwide recognition

Clarke was cast in her third professional role in 2010, as Daenerys Targaryen in the HBO fantasy series Game of Thrones. It is based on the fantasy book series A Song of Ice and Fire by George R. R. Martin. Daenerys is one of the last surviving members of House Targaryen who had ruled Westeros from the Iron Throne for nearly three hundred years prior to being ousted. Actress Tamzin Merchant was originally cast for the part of Daenerys. When the pilot episode was re-shot in early 2010, Merchant was replaced by Clarke. The show ran from April 2011 until May 2019, with Clarke portraying Daenerys throughout all eight seasons.

Clarke received critical acclaim for her portrayal of Daenerys, which traces an arc from frightened girl to powerful woman. Matthew Gilbert of The Boston Globe called her scenes "mesmerising", adding that "Clarke doesn't have a lot of emotional variety to work with as Daenerys, aside from fierce determination, and yet she is riveting." Emily VanDerWerff for The A.V. Club commented on the difficulty of adapting such an evolution from page to screen, but concluded that Clarke "more than seal[s] the deal here."

Clarke said by being cast as Daenerys, she had avoided the "typical bonnet duty that you have to go through as a young British actress". In 2017, she reportedly became one of the highest-paid actors on television, earning between £1.2 and £2 million per episode of Game of Thrones. In 2019, she said she had been uncomfortable acting nude in her first experience at age 23 of a large film set, but had since become "a lot more savvy" about what level of nudity is needed for a scene. Clarke received multiple award nominations and wins for her role of Daenerys. After the first season, Clarke won Best Supporting Actress in a Drama at the 2011 EWwy Awards. She was also nominated three times for Primetime Emmy Award for Outstanding Supporting Actress in a Drama Series in 2013, 2015, and 2016. At the 2019 Emmys, she was nominated for Outstanding Lead Actress in a Drama Series, her first nomination in the category.

In addition to the television show, she lent her voice and likeness to the 2014 video game of the same name. She also made a cameo appearance during Kit Harington monologue on Saturday Night Live in April 2019. She said in a November 2019 NPR interview that if she "were to get stereotyped as the mother of dragons, I could ask for worse. It's really quite wonderful." In a 2021 interview with theSkimm, Clarke stated that she would change the way her character died.

2012–2021: Varied roles, franchise films, and publishing 
Clarke's first film role was in the short film Shackled (2012). The film was featured in the 2020 Amazon Prime Video horror anthology series Murder Manual. The same year, she starred alongside Elliott Tittensor in the comedy film Spike Island. It details a group of friends who try to get to the namesake island of The Stone Roses 1990 concert. The movie was originally distributed only in the United Kingdom but was subsequently picked up by Level 33 Entertainment for North American distribution in March 2015. From March to April 2013, she played Holly Golightly in a Broadway production of Breakfast at Tiffany's, a role requiring her to perform a nude scene. The production, along with her performance, received mixed reviews from critics. Later that year, she also starred in the black comedy-crime drama film Dom Hemingway alongside Jude Law.

In May 2013 Clarke was cast in a film adaptation of the novel The Garden of Last Days. James Franco was set to direct and star in the film however he left the project two weeks before filming after creative differences with the film distributor Millennium Entertainment. In an 2019 interview with The Hollywood Reporter, Clarke said she was offered the role of Anastasia Steele in Fifty Shades of Grey. She said she turned down the part because of the nudity required.

In 2013, she was cast as Sarah Connor in the science fiction action film Terminator Genisys (2015). The film, which also stars Arnold Schwarzenegger, Jai Courtney, and Jason Clarke, received unfavourable reviews from critics but was a box office success, grossing over $440 million worldwide. Clarke was nominated for Teen Choice Award for Choice Summer Movie Star – Female and Best International Actress at the 2016 Jupiter Awards for her performance.

She starred as the female lead, opposite Sam Claflin, in the film adaptation of the best-selling novel of the same name, Me Before You. The film which was released on 3 June 2016 and directed by Thea Sharrock, received mixed critical reviews. The film was a box office success with worldwide revenues of $200 million. For her role as Louisa "Lou" Clark, she shared nominations with Sam Claflin for the Teen Choice Award for Choice Movie Liplock and the MTV Television Tearjerker Award. In 2017, she played the lead as Nurse Verena in the supernatural psychological thriller film Voice from the Stone. The film was released in April 2017 for a limited theatre run, followed by video on demand and digital HD.

She was cast as the female lead in Solo: A Star Wars Story in November 2016. The movie, which was directed by Ron Howard and premiered in May 2018, details the origins of Star Wars characters Han Solo and Chewbacca. Clarke played Qi'ra, Han's childhood friend and love interest. The film received favourable critical reviews despite being the second-lowest grossing Star Wars film. The film was released worldwide on 25 May 2018. Her performance received positive critical reviews with many calling her one of the standouts of the film. Clarke, along with Jack Huston, was cast in 2016 as leads in the film Above Suspicion (2019). The film is based on a thriller novel by Joe Sharkey and directed by Phillip Noyce, and was announced at the 2016 Cannes Film Festival. The film received generally favourable reviews with Clarke's performance being highly praised by critics. It also had a turbulent release which left it vulnerable to piracy. In late 2019, Clarke starred opposite Henry Golding in the romantic comedy Last Christmas. The film was written by Emma Thompson and directed by Paul Feig. In a January 2020 interview with Bustle magazine, Clarke stated she was inspired by Will Ferrell character in the 2003 comedy film Elf. Despite its unfavourable reviews, critics praised Clarke's performance, and the film went on to become a box office success grossing over $121 million worldwide.

Clarke starred as Nina in the West End production of Anton Chekhov's The Seagull, directed by Jamie Lloyd, which began previews on 11 March 2020 at the Playhouse Theatre. The production was suspended on 16 March due to the COVID-19 pandemic. The play is Clarke's first West End production. The production resumed two years later in July 2022 and was broadcast internationally via National Theatre Live. In 2021, Emilia published the first in a series of comic books titled M.O.M.: Mother of Madness that she co-wrote with Marguerite Bennett.

2022–present 
In 2020, Clarke was cast in the animation film The Amazing Maurice. The film, which is an adaptation of The Amazing Maurice and His Educated Rodents by Terry Pratchett, was released in the United Kingdom on December 16, 2022 and in the United States on February 3, 2023. In January 2023, Clarke starred in and executive produced The Pod Generation. The film had its premiere at the Sundance Film Festival and was directed by Sophie Barthes.

Upcoming projects
Clarke was cast as the lead in the upcoming English language adaptation of the 2015 Korean romantic comedy The Beauty Inside in January 2017. , the film was yet to begin production. It was announced in May 2019 that Clarke is set to play the English poet Elizabeth Barrett in the film Let Me Count the Ways, which The Wife director Björn Runge is set to direct. 

In April 2021, Clarke joined the cast of the upcoming series Secret Invasion for Disney+, set in the Marvel Cinematic Universe. The show is set to premiere in 2023. In October 2021, Clarke was cast to portray Jean Kerr, wife of Joseph McCarthy, in a biopic titled McCarthy. In October 2022, it was announced that Clarke is set to play Irish author Constance Lloyd in director Sophie Hyde’s film, An Ideal Wife.

Other ventures

Advertising and endorsements
In 2015, luxury goods company Dior signed Clarke to be the face of the Rose des Vents jewelry collection. In 2018, Dolce & Gabbana announced she would be the brand ambassador for the fragrance "The Only One". She starred in an advertisement, which was directed by Matteo Garrone for the perfume. Cosmetics company Clinique announced Clarke as their first global ambassador in early 2020.

Philanthropy
Clarke has lent her support to various charitable organisations. In September 2011, she joined the SMA UK Trust Team as their celebrity ambassador. The SMA Trust raises funds for research into spinal muscular atrophy. In August 2017, she became a patron of Open Door, a nonprofit that aims to help young people gain access to drama school auditions. She auctioned a chance to watch an episode of Game of Thrones with her at the 2018 Sean Penn Charity Gala, which raised over $120,000 benefiting the J/P HRO & Disaster Relief Organizations. In February 2018, she introduced the award recipients at London's Centrepoint Awards, which celebrates the courage shown by homeless young people.

In April 2018, she was named the sole ambassador to the Royal College of Nursing (RCN). As the RCN's ambassador, Clarke pledged to use her voice to fight for greater investment in nursing and to challenge misconceptions. Clarke also pledged to join nurses and healthcare workers to tackle the issues affecting the profession, including a falling number in training and shortages in the current workforce.

Clarke was also one of the numerous UK-based actresses to lend her voice to the Time's Up initiative, aimed at exposing sexual harassment and abuse, and creating a society free of gender-based discrimination in the workplace. In August 2018, Clarke, as well as Gemma Arterton, Lena Headey, Tom Hiddleston, Felicity Jones, Wunmi Mosaku, Florence Pugh, Gemma Chan, and Catherine Tate, featured in the short film titled Leading Lady Parts which took aim at the film industry's issue of gender inequality during the casting process.

In 2019, upon revealing the brain aneurysms she suffered in 2011 and 2013, Clarke launched her own charity named SameYou. The organisation aims to broaden neurorehabilitation access for young people after a brain injury or stroke. On 26 September 2019, she co-hosted a YouTube live stream with Irish YouTuber Jacksepticeye that raised over £200,000 for SameYou. After the conclusion of the final season of Game of Thrones, a fundraiser called "Justice for Daenerys" was started in which fans of the series raised over £83,000 for her charity. According to the fundraiser creator, the purpose was to collectively show their appreciation for both Clarke and the character of Daenerys Targaryen. In 2020, Clarke was presented with the Public Leadership in Neurology award by the American Brain Foundation for her efforts in raising awareness about neurorehabilitation.

In April 2020, Clarke began a fundraiser to help raise funds for her charity's COVID-19 fund. The fundraiser, which aimed to raise £250,000, would support both the Spaulding Rehabilitation Hospital in Boston, Massachusetts, and the University College Hospital in London. The organisation's new initiative aims to make a larger portion of beds available to coronavirus patients by providing a virtual rehabilitation clinic for people recovering from brain injuries and strokes. In a further response to the coronavirus pandemic, Clarke announced the launch of an Instagram series of poetry readings. The readings derive from a collection called The Poetry Pharmacy: Tried-and-True Prescriptions for the Heart, Mind and Soul. She began the series by reading a poem about loneliness, which she dedicated to her charity SameYou and announced that other performers would be joining the initiative, stating that every performer would dedicate their reading to a charity of their choosing.

In September 2020, she joined Emma Thompson, Sanjeev Bhaskar, and Robert Lindsay in a virtual reading of the play Private Lives by English playwright Noël Coward. It was announced that all funds raised from the performance would be used as a crisis grant to support those in the theatre industry who were struggling financially as a result of the COVID-19 pandemic.

Personal life and public image
Clarke lives in the London Borough of Islington. She also owned a house in the Venice Beach neighbourhood of Los Angeles, which she purchased in 2016 and sold in December 2020.

In a 2013 interview with Allure, Clarke stated that her mother had rules when she was growing up: "Don't do drugs, don't have sex, and don't touch your eyebrows." She stated that she was bullied as a child for "having ridiculous eyebrows".

In an essay she wrote for The New Yorker in 2019, Clarke revealed that she had suffered a subarachnoid haemorrhage caused by a ruptured aneurysm in February 2011. She underwent urgent endovascular coiling surgery and subsequently suffered from aphasia, at one point being unable to recall her own name. She had a second aneurysm surgically treated in 2013.

Clarke was voted the most desirable woman in the world by AskMen readers in 2014. In 2015, she was named Esquires Sexiest Woman Alive and was also recognised with the GQ Woman of the Year Award. Clarke appeared on FHMs 100 Sexiest Women in the World list in 2015, 2016, and 2017. She was also included on Glamours list of Best Dressed Women in 2017.

Once filming wrapped on the final season of Game of Thrones, Clarke, as a tribute to her role as Daenerys Targaryen, celebrated her time on the show with a wrist tattoo featuring a trio of flying dragons.

Filmography

Film

Television

Discography

Theatre

Accolades

Clarke has been nominated for numerous awards throughout her career. She was nominated for four Primetime Emmy Awards, including Outstanding Lead Actress in a Drama Series in 2019, for her role in Game of Thrones. She has received several Critics' Choice Awards nominations, the most recent in 2018. She also received the BAFTA Britannia Award for British Artist of the Year at the 2018 ceremony. In 2018, Clarke was invited to join the Academy of Motion Picture Arts and Sciences. Time magazine named her one of the 100 most influential people in 2019. Clarke has also been honoured for her charitable work. In 2019, she won a Shorty Award for a video that was made to raise awareness for her charity SameYou and the Royal College of Nursing.

Notes

References

External links

 
 

1986 births
Living people
21st-century English actresses
Actresses from Berkshire
Actresses from London
Actresses from Oxfordshire
Alumni of the Drama Centre London
British people of Anglo-Indian descent
English contraltos
English film actresses
English stage actresses
English television actresses
English voice actresses
People educated at Rye St Antony School
People educated at St Edward's School, Oxford